State Route 177 (SR 177) is a state highway in the U.S. state of California in Riverside County. The route runs along Rice Road, linking Interstate 10 (I-10) midway between the Coachella Valley and Blythe on the California–Arizona border, to SR 62 near Rice. SR 177 travels along the eastern portion of the Joshua Tree National Park; like the eastern  of SR 62, it passes through some of the most desolate areas of the Mojave Desert.

Route description

SR 177 begins at I-10 near Desert Center and briefly travels north, intersecting with CR R2. At this intersection, SR 177 turns northeast and travels across the Mojave Desert, through the Chuckwalla Valley. It passes near the Desert Center Airport and comes near Palen Lake, a dry lake. The highway passes along the southeastern boundary of Joshua Tree National Park before turning due north and crossing the desert for several miles. SR 177 briefly turns northeast again before intersecting with SR 62 and defaulting onto SR 62 eastbound.

The route is two lanes wide for its entire length. SR 177 is not part of the National Highway System, a network of highways that are considered essential to the country's economy, defense, and mobility by the Federal Highway Administration. In 2013, SR 177 had an annual average daily traffic (AADT) of 1,200 at the northern terminus with SR 62, and 3,700 at the southern terminus with I-10, the latter of which was the highest AADT for the highway.

History
The Metropolitan Water District built a road from Desert Center that ran north before turning east to Earp along with portions of the Colorado River Aqueduct from February 20 to August 4 in 1933. This was part of a road system that was built in order to support the construction of the aqueduct by connecting the camps that construction workers resided in during the project. This road cost $389,600 (about $ in  dollars) to construct; the roads in the system were paved. SR 177 was added to the state highway system in 1972 by the California State Legislature. As of 1998, Caltrans had no plans to expand the highway, considering it to be "maintain only" through 2015.

Major intersections

See also

References

External links

California @ AARoads.com - State Route 177
Caltrans: Route 177 highway conditions
California Highways: Route 177

177
State Route 177